Buddhika is a Sinhalese name. It may refer to:

Buddhika Pathirana, Sri Lankan politician
Buddhika Mendis, Sri Lankan cricketer
Buddhika Kurukularatne, Sri Lankan politician.
Charitha Buddhika, Sri Lankan cricketer

Sinhalese masculine given names
Masculine given names